Caulastrocecis tripunctella is a moth of the family Gelechiidae. It is found in the Russian Far East (Amur region).

References

Moths described in 1884
Caulastrocecis